The Cladova is a right tributary of the river Bega in Romania. It discharges into the Bega in Bethausen.

References

Rivers of Romania
Rivers of Timiș County